The King of Alo (titled as Tu`i Agaifo) is the ruler of the polity of Alo, one of the two chiefdoms (Royaume coutumier) located on Futuna. Alo encompasses the eastern part of the island.

Futuna is one of the Hoorn Islands in the French overseas collectivity of Wallis and Futuna, in Oceania in the South Pacific Ocean.

List of rulers of Alo

Fakavelikele
 Fakavelikele
 Pili
 Mala'evaoa
 Nimo o le Tano'a
 Veliteki (1748–1756)
 ... (1756–1784)
 Fonati (1784–1839?)

Tu`i Agaifo
 Fonoti (1837?–1839?)
 Niuliki (1839?–1841)
 Musumusu (1841–1844) (Regent)
 Filipo Meitala (1844–1862)
 Alia Segi (1862–18..)
 Soane Malia Musulamu (1887?–1929)
 Soane Moefana (1929–1932)
 Tuiseka
 Usanio Pipisega
 Paloto Aika
 Savelio Meitala
 Kamilo Katea
 Maleselino Maituku
 Kolio Maituku
 Papilio Talae
 Lelipo Pipisega
 Alesio Feta'u
 Petelo Savo Meitala
 Soane Va Pipisega
 Silisio Katea
 Petelo Talae
 Vito Tuiseka
 Petelo Maituku (19.. – 27 December 1958) (1st time)
 Setefano Tuikalepa (29 December 1958 – 8 February 1960)
 Kamaliele Moefana (9 February 1960 – 9 December 1961)
 Pio Tagatamanogi (28 December 1961 – 8 September 1962)
 Mikaele Fanene (15 September 1962 – 19..)
 Seteone Pipisega (19.. – 30 May 1970)
 Petelo Maituku (1 June 1970 – 1 May 1973) (2nd time)
 Mikaele Katea (10 May 1973 – 17 April 1974)
 Patita Savea (20 April 1974 – 28 December 1976)
 Kalepo Nau (11 January 1977 – 17 July 1978)
 Nopeleto Tuikalepa (15 March 1979 – 29 October 1984)
 Petelo Lemo (20 November 1984 – 24 February 1990)
 Lomano Musulamu (24 February 1990 – 1 February 1995)
 Esipio Takasi (6 April 1995 – 9 July 1997)
 Sagato Alofi (10 July 1997 – October 2002)
 Soane Patita Maituku (21 November 2002 – 19 February 2008)
 Petelo Vikena (6 November 2008 – 22 January 2010)
 Vacant (22 January 2010 – 17 January 2014)
 Petelo Sea (17 January 2014 – 14 May 2016)
 Vacant (14 May 2016 – 7 June 2016)
 Filipo Katoa (17 June 2016 – 3 October 2018)
 Lino Leleivai (29 November 2018 – present)

See also
 List of kings of Sigave
 List of kings of Uvea

Notes

References

External links
 World Statesmen – Wallis and Futuna
 "Dernieres préparatifs avant l'intronisation de Petelo Sea." Nouvellecaledonie.la1ere.fr. Nouvelle Calédonie 1re, 17 Jan. 2014. Web. 21 Jan. 2014."

Alo